Met My Match is a song by The Whitlams. It was released on 2 June 1995 as the second single from their second studio album, Undeniably.

Track listing
 "Met My Match" - 3:36
 "Following My Own Tracks" -  3:31
 "Pass The Flagon" - 3:32
 "You'll Find a Way" - 4:25

References

The Whitlams songs
1995 singles
Songs written by Tim Freedman
1994 songs